The molecular formula C3H10N2 (molar mass: 74.12 g/mol, exact mass: 74.08440 u) may refer to:

 1,2-Diaminopropane (propane-1,2-diamine)
 1,3-Diaminopropane

Molecular formulas